Anatude is the eleventh studio album by Finnish pop singer Antti Tuisku, released on 15 September 2017 through Warner Music Finland. In its first week of release, the album debuted at number one on the Finnish Albums Chart, becoming Tuisku's fifth number one album.

Track listing

Charts

Release history

See also
List of number-one albums of 2017 (Finland)

References

2017 albums
Antti Tuisku albums
Finnish-language albums